The Armed Forces Information Service (Ypiresia Enimeroseos Enoplon Dynameon, YENED) was the television and radio station of the Greek Armed Forces, operating from 1966 until its conversion to a civilian broadcaster in 1982.

History

TED begins
The station was set up on an experimental basis on the grounds of the Hellenic Military Geographical Service, and began broadcasting on 27 February 1966, a few days after the start of television broadcasts from the National Radio Foundation (EIR). Originally it was called Armed Forces Television (Τηλεόρασις Ενόπλων Δυνάμεων, ΤΕΔ).

TED becomes YENED
In November 1970, it was renamed the Armed Forces Information Service, now including radio stations as well. It remained under military control until 3 November 1982, when it was renamed ERT2.

Last years under the civilian control as ERT-2
In 1987, ERT2 and ERT1 were amalgamated into a single company, and ERT2 became ET2 (and later New Hellenic Television or NET).

Depictions in other media
The early days of the station's existence are dramatized in the 1984 cult Greek comedy Loafing and Camouflage by Nicos Perakis, based on his own experience there during his military service.

External links 
 The station signal

1966 establishments in Greece
1982 disestablishments in Greece
Television in Greece
Military of Greece
Defunct radio stations in Greece
Defunct television channels in Greece

Military broadcasting
Mass media of the military